Elwell may refer to:

Elwell, Devon, England
Elwell, Michigan, United States
 Elwell Liberty, part of Wyke Regis and Elwell Liberty

People with the Surname
Ann Elwell (1922–1996), British linguist and intelligence officer
Daniel Elwell, FAA administrator
Dennis Elwell (disambiguation)
Dennis Elwell (astrologer) (1930–2014), British astrologer
Dennis Elwell (politician) (born 1945), former mayor of Secaucus, New Jersey
Francis Edwin Elwell (1858–1922), American sculptor
Frederick William Elwell (1870–1958), English painter
Esther Elwell, involved in Salem Witch Trials
James T. Elwell, American developer and legislator
Joseph Bowne Elwell (1873–1920), American bridge player, tutor, and writer
Keith Elwell (born 1950), British rugby league player
Herbert Elwell (1898–1974), American music critic and composer
Hildebrand Elwell, English politician
Robert Elwell (fl. 1417–1431), English politician
Stuart Elwell (born 1977), English boxer
Clarence Edward Elwell (1904–1973), American prelate of the Roman Catholic Church